MOIK Baku is an Azerbaijani football club, based in Baku. MOIK was originally built around the same concept of military sports club as CSKA Moscow, CSKA Sofia.

History
The club was established under name OIK in 1961 as sport society of Azerbaijani Armed Forces and was funded by USSR Ministry of Defense until 1990 and Azerbaijan Ministry of Defense since 1993. It has never participated at any Soviet football league, just one time has entered Soviet Cup and has been eliminated in preliminary round, but 4 times has won Azerbaijan USSR League and 8 times Azerbaijan USSR Cup. MOIK began to participate at Azerbaijan First Division in 1993, making its Azerbaijan Premier League debut in 1995. The club has won Azerbaijan First Division two times. Its best indicator at Azerbaijan Premier League is the 7th place (2001). To the beginning of 2003–04 season the club changed its name into MOIK.

Achievements
Azerbaijan USSR League Champions: 4
1962, 1968, 1970, 1979

Azerbaijan USSR Cup Winner: 8
1962, 1963, 1969, 1970, 1973, 1974, 1976, 1978

Azerbaijan First Division Winner:
 Winners (2): 2000–01, 2018–19

 Runners-up (3): 1994–95, 2007–08, 2009–10

League and domestic cup history

Current squad
(captain)''

External links
 MOIK Baku at PFL.AZ

Football clubs in Azerbaijan
1961 establishments in Azerbaijan
Association football clubs established in 1961